Comfort Systems USA, Inc. (NYSE:FIX) provides heating, ventilation and air conditioning (HVAC) installation, maintenance, repair and replacement services within the mechanical services industry. The Company has 38 operating units in 72 cities and 86 locations throughout the United States. The Company operates primarily in the commercial, industrial and institutional HVAC markets. In addition to standard HVAC services, it also provides specialized applications, such as building automation control systems, fire protection, process cooling, electronic monitoring and process piping. Certain locations also perform related activities, such as electrical service and plumbing.  The company is publicly traded on the New York Stock Exchange under the symbol 'FIX'.

Comfort Systems USA, Inc. was formed by the simultaneous merger and public offering of 12 companies in 1997, and subsequently grew via acquisition until it sold 19 subsidiaries to EMCOR in 2002 in order to reduce debt following the events of 9/11/2001.  After paying down all of its debt by 2005, the Company resumed its growth via acquisition and investments in its existing businesses.

References

Heating, ventilation, and air conditioning companies
Companies listed on the New York Stock Exchange